John J. Sinsimer (March 19, 1923 – September 26, 1997) was an American politician who served in the New Jersey General Assembly from 1972 to 1976. 

He died on September 26, 1997, at his home in Pompton Lakes, New Jersey at age 74. He is the only Democrat to have represented the 24th District.

References

1923 births
1997 deaths
Democratic Party members of the New Jersey General Assembly
People from Pompton Lakes, New Jersey
Politicians from Passaic County, New Jersey
20th-century American politicians